Reali ferriere ed Officine di Mongiana or Villaggio Siderurgico di Mongiana (in English: Mongiana Royal Iron Foundry and Works or The Iron & Steel town of Mangiano) was an iron and steel foundry in the small town of Mongiana, in Calabria (Italy). It was founded in 1770–71 by the Bourbons of Naples and closed in 1881, 20 years after the Kingdom of Italy was established.
In 1860 the foundry employed up to 1600 workers.

History 
The architect who build the first complex was the neapolitan Mario Gioffredo at 1771 and the first director was G.F. Conty.

French Period

Bourbon Period

Italy Period

Direttori 
 Giovan Francesco Conty (1771–1790)
 Massimiliano Conty (1791–1799)
 Vincenzo Squillace (1799–1807)
 Capitano Vincenzo Ritucci (1808–1811)
 Capitano Michele Carrascosa (1811–1814)
 Tenente Colonnello Nicola Landi (1814–1820)
 Tenente Colonnello Mori (1820–1838)
 Tenente Colonnello Niola (1839–1849)
 Tenente Colonnello Pietro Tonson Latour (1849–1852)
 Tenente Colonnello Ferdinando Pacifici (1852–1859)
 Maggiore Giuseppe Del Bono (1860–1861)
 Colonnello Alessandro Massimino (1861–1861)
 Capitano Crescenzo Montagna (1862–1870)

References

Bibliography

See also 

 Mongiana
 Vallata dello Stilaro
 Serre calabresi
 Ecomuseo delle ferriere e fonderie di Calabria
 Officine di Pietrarsa

Calabria
Industrial archaeology